The 2007 Vodacom Cup was the 10th edition of this annual domestic cup competition. The Vodacom Cup is played between provincial rugby union teams in South Africa from the Currie Cup Premier and First Divisions.

Competition
There were 14 teams participating in the 2007 Vodacom Cup competition. These teams were geographically divided into two sections - the Northern Section and the Southern Section, each with seven teams. Teams would play all the other teams in their section once over the course of the season, either at home or away.

Teams received four points for a win and two points for a draw. Bonus points were awarded to teams that score four or more tries in a game, as well as to teams losing a match by seven points or less. Teams were ranked by points, then points difference (points scored less points conceded).

The top four teams in each section qualified for the play-offs. In the quarter finals, the teams that finished first in each section had home advantage against the teams that finished fourth in the other section and the teams that finished second in each section had home advantage against the teams that finished third in the other section. The winners of these quarter finals then played each other in the semi-finals, with the higher placed team having home advantage. The two semi-final winners then met in the final.

Teams

Changes from 2006
The single pool was scrapped and all teams were geographically divided into two sections.

Team Listing
The following teams took part in the 2007 Vodacom Cup competition:

Tables

Northern Section

Southern Section

Results

Northern Section

Round one

Round two

Round three

Round four

Round Five

Round Six

Round Seven

Southern Section

Round one

Round two

Round three

Round four

Round Five

Round Six

Round Seven

Quarter-finals

Semi-finals

Final

Winners

References

 

Vodacom Cup
2007 in South African rugby union